DYNO is a BMX bike and bike products company started by Bob Morales in 1982.

History 
DYNO's first products were BMX racing apparel and number plates. DYNO gear was used and endorsed by many top BMX and Freestyle riders and teams, including; GT Bicycles, SE Racing, Auburn Cycles, Robinson Racing and Team Powerlite. Riders included Eddie Fiola, Mike Dominguez, Greg Hill, Gary Ellis and many others.

In 1985 Bob Morales said "GT Bicycles made an offer to buy Dyno. I accepted their offer because Dyno was severely undercapitalized and in need of investment. I negotiated a contract with GT to design bicycle frames and components and to consult on a marketing strategy for them."

Morales developed a line of DYNO frames and bicycles for GT. DYNO also produced a line of clothing apparel and shoes under the DYNO brand. The DYNO brand is now owned by Pacific Cycle, a subsidiary of the Dutch conglomerate Pon Holdings.

References

External links 
DYNO BMX Company DYNO timeline on 23mag

BMX